Myqerem Fuga was an Albanian politician and chair of the Executive Committee of Tirana from 1970 through 1973.

References

Year of birth missing
Year of death missing
Mayors of Tirana